Visual Logic is a graphical authoring tool which allows students to write and execute programs using flowcharts. It is typically used in an academic setting to teach introductory programming concepts.

See also 
 Alice
 Flowgorithm
 Raptor
 Scratch

References

External links 
 

Visual programming languages
Educational programming languages
educational software
Pedagogic integrated development environments